Monoaminergic means "working on monoamine neurotransmitters", which include serotonin, dopamine, norepinephrine, epinephrine, and histamine.

A monoaminergic, or monoaminergic drug, is a chemical, which functions to directly modulate the serotonin, dopamine, norepinephrine, epinephrine, and/or histamine neurotransmitter systems in the brain. Monoaminergics include catecholaminergics (which can be further divided into adrenergics and dopaminergics), serotonergics, and histaminergics.

Examples of monoaminergic drugs include monoamine precursors, monoamine receptor modulators, monoamine reuptake inhibitors, monoamine releasing agents, and monoamine metabolism modulators such as monoamine oxidase inhibitors.

See also
 Adenosinergic
 Adrenergic
 Cannabinoidergic
 Cholinergic
 Dopaminergic
 GABAergic
 Glycinergic
 Histaminergic
 Melatonergic
 Opioidergic
 Serotonergic

References

Neurochemistry
Neurotransmitters